The North American section of the 2019 FIVB Volleyball Men's Challenger Cup qualification acted as a qualifier for the 2019 FIVB Volleyball Men's Challenger Cup, for national teams which are members of the North, Central America and Caribbean Volleyball Confederation (NORCECA). The tournament was held in Havana, Cuba from 30 May to 1 June 2019. The winners Cuba qualified for the 2019 Challenger Cup.

Qualification
The hosts Cuba and the top three ranked teams from the NORCECA Ranking as of 1 January 2019 not yet participating in the 2019 Nations League qualified for the tournament. But, Dominican Republic later withdrew. Rankings are shown in brackets except the hosts who ranked 3rd.

 (Hosts)
 (4)
 (5)
 (6)

Venue
 Coliseo de la Ciudad Deportiva, Havana, Cuba

Pool standing procedure
 Number of matches won
 Match points
 Sets ratio
 Points ratio
 Result of the last match between the tied teams

Match won 3–0: 5 match points for the winner, 0 match points for the loser
Match won 3–1: 4 match points for the winner, 1 match point for the loser
Match won 3–2: 3 match points for the winner, 2 match points for the loser

Round robin
All times are Cuba Daylight Time (UTC−04:00).

Final standing
{| class="wikitable" style="text-align:center"
|-
!width=40|Rank
!width=180|Team
|- bgcolor=#ccffcc
|1
|style="text-align:left"|
|-
|2
|style="text-align:left"|
|-
|3
|style="text-align:left"|
|}

References

External links
2019 Challenger Cup North American Qualifier – official website

2019 FIVB Volleyball Men's Challenger Cup qualification
FIVB
2019 in Cuban sport
International volleyball competitions hosted by Cuba
FIVB Volleyball Men's Challenger Cup qualification
FIVB Volleyball Men's Challenger Cup qualification